The Halberstadt CL.IV was a German ground attack aircraft of World War I.

Design and development
Karl Thies, chief designer of the Halberstädter Flugzeugwerke, G.m.b.H., designed the CL.IV as a replacement for the CL.II. As the CL.II had proven to be particularly effective in the ground support role, the focus of an improved version was to create a specific ground attack aircraft.

The new CL.IV featured a shorter, strengthened fuselage and a horizontal stabilizer of greater span and higher aspect ratio than that of the CL.II. These changes, along with a one-piece, horn-balanced elevator, gave the CL.IV much greater maneuverability than its predecessor. After tests were completed of the prototype in April 1918, at least 450 were ordered from Halberstadt, and an additional 250 aircraft from a subcontractor, LFG (Roland), as Halberstadt CL.IV(Rol).

Operational history
The Halberstadt CL.IV was one of the most effective ground attack aircraft of World War I, relying on its good maneuverability to avoid ground fire. It appeared on the Western Front towards the end of the German offensives in 1918. Flights of four to six aircraft flew close support missions, at an altitude of less than one hundred feet, suppressing enemy infantry and artillery fire just ahead of the advancing German troops. After these late German offensives stalled, Halberstadt CL.IVs were used to disrupt advancing Allied offensives by striking at enemy troop assembly points and night sorties were also made against Allied airfields.

Towards the end of the war, on bright, moonlit nights, CL.IV squadrons attempted to intercept and destroy Allied bombers as they returned from their missions.

In 1921, the newly established German airline Luftverkehr Paul Strähle operated three CL.IVs, converted to carry two passengers, operating them on services between Stuttgart and Konstanz, adding a route between Stuttgart and Nuremberg in 1922. They remained in use until 1923.

Operators

Luftstreitkräfte

 Luftverkehr Paul Strähle

Estonian Air Force

Lithuanian Air Force: 12 aircraft (No. 9432, 5814, 5831, 5909, 5915, 5920, 5937, 6589, 8176, 8192, 9409, 9486)

Polish Air Force: 3 aircraft

Russian Air Force

Specifications

Notes

Bibliography
 Gerdessen, Frederik. "Estonian Air Power 1918 – 1945". Air Enthusiast, No. 18, April – July 1982. pp. 61–76. .
 Gray, Peter and Thetford, Owen. German Aircraft of the First World War. London: Putnam, 1962.

External links

Smithsonian National Air and Space Museum: Halberstadt CL.IV

CL.IV
1910s German attack aircraft
Military aircraft of World War I
Single-engined tractor aircraft
Biplanes
Aircraft first flown in 1918